That Sun in the Sky is a 2016 South Korea morning soap opera starring Yoon A-jung,
Lee Min-woo, Noh Young-hak, Kim Hye-ji. It aired on KBS2 from September 7, 2016 on Mondays to Fridays at 09:00 for 121 episodes.

It is the 41st TV Novel series (10th in 2010s) of KBS.

Summary 
This series depicting the process of a pure countryside woman overcoming many obstacles and growing into the best actor in Korea in the 1970s.

Cast

Main 
 Yoon A-jung as Kang In-kyung
 Lee Min-woo as Nam Jung-ho
 Noh Young-hak as Cha Min-woo / Kim Shin-woo
 Kim Hye-ji as Nam Hee-ae

Supporting

People around In-kyung 
 Oh Seung-yoon as Kang Han-soo
 Yoon Bok-in as Park Mal-soon

People at Ran-guk Dong 
 Han Ga-rim as Bae Choon-ja
 Han Ji-an as Oh Kim-soon
 Kim Seung-dae as Heo Chil-bong

Baedo Film Studio 
 Ban Min-jung as Yoon Mi-hee
 Ha Jee-un as Lee Seo-yeon
 Lee Jae-yong as Nam Tae-joon
 Hyun Chul-ho as Kim Choong-seok

Seongri Transport 
 Choi Joon-yong as Lee Hyung-ok
 Kim Kyu-chul as Byun Geun-tae
 Park Kyung-hye as Go Sung-ran
 Jang Tae-sung as Ma Chul-hee
 Lee Myung-ho as Im Hee-sang

Ratings 
In this table, The blue numbers represent the lowest ratings and the red numbers represent the highest ratings.
NR denotes that the drama did not rank in the top 20 daily programs on that date.

References

External links
  

Korean Broadcasting System television dramas
Korean-language television shows
2016 South Korean television series debuts
2017 South Korean television series endings